Menius is a genus of leaf beetles in the subfamily Eumolpinae. It is known from Africa.

Species
 Menius conradti Jacoby, 1903
 Menius cyaneipes Pic, 1939
 Menius lacordairei Chapuis, 1874
 Menius madagascariensis Jacoby, 1897
 Menius mombassanus Burgeon, 1942
 Menius nitidissimus Pic, 1953
 Menius purpureus Pic, 1939
 Menius ruficeps Pic, 1939
 Menius rufus Pic, 1940
 Menius simplex Weise, 1909
 Menius splendidus Jacoby, 1893
 Menius subcostatus Jacoby, 1893
 Menius viridicupreus Burgeon, 1941

References

Eumolpinae
Chrysomelidae genera
Taxa named by Félicien Chapuis
Beetles of Africa